Ano Veli Samuel Turtiainen (25 August 1967 in Sääminki) is a Finnish former powerlifter and a politician currently serving in the Parliament of Finland for the South-Eastern Finland constituency. He is also founder and leader of Power Belongs to the People party. He lives in Juva. Turtiainen was elected to the parliament in the 2019 parliamentary election. Turtiainen was expelled from the Finns Party due to a racist tweet mocking the murder of George Floyd in February 2021.

Sports career 
Turtiainen competed for the International Powerlifting Federation, World Powerlifting Congress and World Powerlifting Organization. In 1998, Turtiainen was tested positive for androgenic drugs and banned for two years. In 2002, he set a deadlift world record 405.5 kg for WPC.

Political career 
2017 Turtiainen was elected into municipal council of Juva in Southern Savonia as a representative of the Finns Party.

In 2019 parliamentary election Turtiainen was elected member of parliament from the South East Finland constituency.

Controversy
January 2020 Finnish newspaper Iltalehti revealed that Turtiainen had used travel expense allowance during his sick leave. Turtiainen also had the highest count of the allowance usage according to the paper.

The same month Turtiainen mocked a Finnish police officer on Twitter who filed a report of an offence. District attorney dropped the charges later, calling Turtiainen's statement to be within limits of acceptable criticism towards authorities despite the use of derogatory wording.

Expulsion from the Finns party 
On 3 June 2020 Turtiainen mocked the murder of George Floyd on his Twitter account with a tweet showing an image of Floyd, a police officer's knee on his neck and his face colorized pink, with the phrase "Pink Floyd". His parliamentary group called the tweet "not acceptable". The tweet was later deleted. As a response to Turtiainen's tweet, the Finns Party expelled him from the parliamentary group. The previous misconduct was taken account as well. Citing zero tolerance for racism, US-based company Elitefts announced that it is ending its business relationship with Ano Turtiainen's company, Metal Sport & Gear.

Turtiainen proceeded to found his own parliamentary group of one man. He appointed as the group secretary a former the Finns Party MP James Hirvisaari. Hirvisaari had been expelled from the Finns Party in 2013 after two incidents: he refused to fire his assistant who published racist post on the internet and his parliamentary visitor performed a Nazi salute which Hirvisaari photographed.

Covid-19 
Turtiainen has criticized actions related to Covid-19 pandemic, calling them "neo-communism" and he has refused to take a Covid vaccine. He has also been spreading conspiracy theory related Covid-memes on his social media platforms. Within the Parliament Turtiainen has caused controversy by refusing to wear a face mask during the time it was recommended. He has been using derogatory language towards the Chairmen after receiving animadversions from them regarding the face mask issue. In one instance fellow representatives interpreted his hand signs and choice of words as a violent threat. Spring 2021 Turtiainen stated that he is "ready to kill if somebody in this country is forced to wear a mask". However in Autumn 2020 it was revealed that his own company did manufacture and resale face masks. Turtiainen commented, he has nothing against the usage of protective equipment.

Power Belongs to the People 
2021 Turtiainen expanded his parliamentary group into a full political party, called "Power Belongs to the People". According to the party, the required 5,000 voter signatures were collected in a one day.

After the 2022 Russian Invasion of Ukraine Turtiainen has caused public controversy with statements supporting Russia. The controversy has caused 2 of 10 Regional Council representatives of Power Belongs to the People to resign from the party. Turtiainen calls them "opportunists".

Criminal record
In December 2015 Turtiainen published a Facebook status saying that "people had taken great personal risks when acting in elimination operations to destroy existing and planned asylum centres". In his Facebook status, Turtiainen considered the Finnish Red Cross to be his greatest enemy and wrote if "it was now time to expand operations to the enemy headquarters". The matter escalated into a controversy after Member of Parliament Laura Huhtasaari had liked the status. The Finnish Red Cross reported Turtiainen's message to the police. In September 2018 Turtiainen was sentenced in the district court of Southern Savonia to 60 day-fines for public incitement to crime. After being elected as a Member of Parliament, Turtiainen commented that "in this company this sentence is just a feather in my cap".

Turtiainen has been sentenced for assault as well. According to Helsingin Sanomat, the district court of Southern Savonia sentenced Turtiainen to fines in March 2010 for assaulting a 14-year-old boy from Juva. Turtiainen had been previously sentenced for assault in 1995 and 1997.

Entrepreneurship 
Turtiainen owns 60% of the company METAL SPORT Licensing Oy, 50% of the company Gometal Oy and 50% of the company Bobbin Oy (Metal Sport). On 21.4.2022 Gometal Oy was declared bankrupt due to accrued taxes owed. Gometal Oy sold powerlifting equipment, clothing and Power Belongs to the People Party's fan products.

References

1967 births
Living people
People from Savonlinna
Finns Party politicians
Members of the Parliament of Finland (2019–23)
Finnish powerlifters
Finnish sportspeople in doping cases
Political party founders